Sigismund Streit (13 April 1687 – in Berlin; 20 December 1775 in Padua) was a prominent German merchant and art patron of the 18th century in Venice.

Life 
Born in Berlin, he came to Venice in 1709, where he accumulated substantial wealth. He died childless and bequeathed his collection to institutions in Germany, including the Berlinisches Gymnasium zum Grauen Kloster in Berlin.
He came to own paintings by Canaletto, Antoine Pesne, Jacopo Amigoni, Francesco Zuccarelli, and Giuseppe Nogari. He was a contemporary of another patron Johann Matthias von der Schulenburg.

External links 

 
 BZ: Sebastian Preuss: Ein Berliner in Venedig: Die Gemäldegalerie erinnert an den Canaletto-Sammler Sigismund Streit. Als Preußen die Republik loben musste

References

1687 births
1775 deaths
German art collectors
18th-century art collectors
Italian art collectors
German emigrants to Italy
People from Berlin
People from the Margraviate of Brandenburg